Birkdale High School is an all-boys secondary school with academy status situated in Southport in North West England. Located close to neighbouring schools Christ the King and Greenbank High School (the equivalent girls' school), Birkdale was originally a co-educational school known as Birkdale Secondary Modern School. The school does not have a sixth form and only takes boys from ages 11–16.

Notable former pupils

Jack Bainbridge, footballer for Southport
Matthew Baldwin, professional golfer
Jake Bidwell, footballer for Coventry City
Delial Brewster, former professional footballer
Matthew Hudson, footballer for Preston North End
Kyle Joseph, footballer for Swansea City
Mikey O'Neil, footballer for Preston North End
Jack Rodwell, footballer for Western Sydney Wanderers

Ofsted
Birkdale was judged by Ofsted in 2006 as Good.

In 2011 the school was judged Inadequate and placed into Special Measures.

In 2013 Ofsted carried out a full inspection and gave the school a Good rating.

Notable Incidents
In 2010, a former teaching assistant was charged with having sex with 2 16-year-old students whom she invited into her house in Hightown, in Merseyside and had Intercourse with. She got a 16 Month prison sentence. Also a Former Headteacher was jailed for sex offences in 2017.

References

Boys' schools in Merseyside
Academies in the Metropolitan Borough of Sefton
Buildings and structures in Southport
Secondary schools in the Metropolitan Borough of Sefton